County Route 541 (CR 541) is a county highway in the U.S. state of New Jersey. The highway extends  from U.S. Route 206 (US 206) in Shamong Township to US 130 and CR 543 in Burlington.

Route description

CR 541 begins at an intersection with US 206 in Shamong Township, Burlington County, heading northwest on two-lane undivided Stokes Road. The road passes through forested areas before intersecting, entering a mix of farms and homes. The route reaches a junction with CR 648 before crossing CR 534. CR 541 continues through wooded areas with a few farm fields before heading into forested areas with a few residences. The route briefly joins with CR 620 as it crosses into Medford and intersects CR 622. CR 541 eventually forms the border between Medford to the west and Medford Lakes to the east before fully entering Medford Lakes as it continues through forested residential subdivisions to the west of Aetna Lake. After a junction with the western terminus of CR 532, the route gains a center left-turn lane and borders Medford Lakes to the west and Medford to the east before fully entering Medford again as it passes businesses, with a four-lane stretch near the Jackson Road intersection. The road narrows to two lanes and passes a few farms before coming into the residential and commercial downtown of Medford, where CR 541 becomes Main Street. The route crosses Route 70, at which point it becomes Medford-Mount Holly Road and passes residential areas as it reaches the CR 616 junction. CR 541 continues through a mix of farmland, woodland, and some homes as it crosses into Lumberton Township. Here, the road intersects CR 636 and CR 612 before coming near a few residential subdivisions as it comes to the CR 640 and CR 641 junctions, with the road name changing to Main Street.

CR 541 passes near woods and homes before splitting from Main Street by turning west onto the four-lane undivided Mount Holly Bypass, with CR 691 continuing north on Main Street toward Mount Holly. The road turns north and becomes a divided highway as it passes through industrial areas and comes to an intersection with Route 38. After this, the route enters Hainesport Township and passes more industry before crossing Conrail Shared Assets Operations' Pemberton Industrial Track railroad line and CR 537. The road turns northwest and then northeast through wooded areas and crosses into Mount Holly Township. After crossing the Rancocas River, the route intersects CR 626 and heads north past residential neighborhoods. Upon intersecting CR 691 again, CR 541 turns northwest onto Burlington-Mount Holly Road, a four-lane divided highway that has intersections with jughandles. The route enters Westampton Township and crosses CR 630, where it heads into agricultural areas with some businesses, meeting CR 638. CR 541 comes to an interchange with the New Jersey Turnpike and intersects CR 637 a short distance later. From this point, the road becomes a six-lane divided highway and crosses into Burlington Township, where it heads into businesses areas, passing the former Burlington Center Mall. The route comes to a cloverleaf interchange with I-295 and narrows back to four lanes, passing more businesses. At the CR 634 intersection, CR 541 narrows into an undivided road that passes a mix of residences and commercial establishments, becoming Mount Holly Road before intersecting CR 635. At this point, the route turns north onto High Street, a three-lane road with a center left-turn lane that runs through residential areas as it comes into Burlington. After the CR 632 junction, CR 541 becomes a four-lane undivided road that passes businesses before coming to its northern terminus at US 130 and CR 543. High Street continues north from here into downtown Burlington.

History 
From Mount Holly to Medford, the road was once maintained by the Mount Holly, Lumberton, and Medford Turnpike, chartered in 1854. The road from Mount Holly to Burlington was once maintained by the Mount Holly and Burlington Turnpike, chartered in 1857.

The Mount Holly Bypass was formerly County Route 541 Alternate while CR 541 ran through the town. The former route of CR 541 through Mount Holly is now Burlington County Route 691.

Major intersections

CR 541 Truck

County Route 541 Truck (CR 541T) is a bypass of a section of County Route 541 near Burlington City. The route runs along the Burlington Bypass between Cadillac Road in Burlington Township, north to CR 670 (Jacksonville Road) in Burlington City. The bypass is maintained by Burlington County and its construction was originally funded by the Burlington County Bridge Commission.

The bypass begins at Cadillac Road, just east of CR 541 and an offramp from CR 541 northbound. The two to three-lane road heads north-northwest between businesses and restaurants. At an apartment complex entrance, a ramp for southbound traffic to connect directly to CR 541 and CR 634 (Sunset Road) is present. The road narrows to two lanes where is passes between Burlington Township Middle School and a fire station. Continuing north-northwest on a straight course, CR 541T intersects Fountain Avenue, crosses into the city limits of Burlington, and ends at a signalized intersection with CR 670. Signage at this intersection indicates that CR 541T continues west along CR 670 to US 130.

CR 541T was constructed on the right-of-way of the former Burlington and Mount Holly Railroad. Construction began on the road in November 1985 and was opened in August 1986. Following completion of the bypass road, trucks were banned on CR 541 in Burlington City. The road is maintained by Burlington County.

See also

References

External links 

New Jersey 5xx Routes (Dan Moraseski)
CR 541 pictures

541
541